is a puzzle video game and the first video game in the Taisen Puzzle-Dama series. It was released in July 1994 by Konami in Japanese arcades. It was released in Europe as Crazy Cross.

Gameplay

The Gameplay is similar to Puyo Puyo. The player must beat the opponent by creating combos, which involve matching three balls or more of the same color simultaneously. Doing so will fill the opponent's side with colored blocks from either the top or bottom. The blocks contain a certain ball color, depending on the color of the block. When blocks are matched, the color ball is released. The side that exceeds the top first loses. Score is also added for both sides, but the opponent's score doesn't affect the rounds in any way.

Characters
 (voiced by Ai Orikasa)
 (voiced by Chisa Yokoyama)
 (voiced by ???)
 (voiced by ???)
 (voiced by Issei Futamata)
 (voiced by Toshiyuki Morikawa)
 (voiced by ???)
 (voiced by Hekiru Shiina)
 (voiced by Toshiyuki Morikawa)
 (voiced by Toshiyuki Morikawa)
 (voiced by Toshiyuki Morikawa)

Reception
It was Japan's third highest-grossing arcade printed circuit board (PCB) software of 1995, below Virtua Fighter 2 and Puzzle Bobble.

Legacy
 This game was parodied in Jikkyou Oshaberi Parodius: Forever with me, using John Wanjiro, Penkuro and Temple Lord in that order as bosses in stage 7.
 Penkuro and John Wanjiro from Taisen Puzzle-Dama makes a brief cameo in the interactive game TwinBee PARADISE in Donburishima.
 Penkuro, Makorin and Temple Lord makes as picture nonogram in the mobile game Pixel Puzzle Collection.

References

Puzzle video games
1994 video games
Arcade video games
Arcade-only video games
Konami games
Japan-exclusive video games
Konami arcade games
Video games developed in Japan

ja:対戦ぱずるだま